Roger Elliot may refer to:

Roger Elliot, character in Batman: Streets of Gotham
Roger Elliot, character in Winner Take All (1932 film)

See also
Roger Elliott (disambiguation)
Elliot Rodger, perpetrator of the 2014 Isla Vista killings